BNHS may refer to:
 Belfast Natural History Society, Northern Ireland
 Birmingham Natural History Society, England
 Bombay Natural History Society, India

Schools 
 Balayan National High School, Balayan, Batangas, Philippines
 Bata National High School, a public high school in Bacolod, Negros Occidental, Philippines
 Balibago National High School, Santa Rosa City, Laguna, Philippines
 Belvidere North High School, Belvidere, Illinois, United States
 Byron Nelson High School, Trophy Club, Texas, United States

bagnen national high school